Colin Dussault's Blues Project is a Cleveland, Ohio, based five piece blues-rock group best known for songs such as "Little Chicken Wing Girl," "Good Booty & BBQ," "O.J. Simpson's DNA," and "Tidioute, Pennsylvania Revisited;" and their 1998 remake of James Taylor's "Fire and Rain". The band's CD releases, live shows, and work schedule have resulted in the group being called the "Hardest Working Band in Northern Ohio. Their tag line is "Our Music is better than it sounds"."

Formed in 1989 in Cleveland, Ohio, Colin Dussault's Blues Project is a harmonica-driven, blues-based rock 'n' soul band. Founder and leader Dussault has been called "a powerful, yet warm singer" with a "howling phlegmatic voice that sounds like Bobby Bland trying to scream over the roar of a DC-9" with a blues harp style "...and a must-hear not only for blues fans but for fans of Cleveland's rich musical history". His "stage presence, charisma and wonderful voice are the makings of a national blues figure. His harmonica style is influenced by the Chicago blues of the '50s, the British blues of the '60s, and American country and folk idioms. An official endorser of Hohner harmonicas since 1994, Dussault plays the Hohner Big River model in second position, or cross-harp style.

History
Dussault began his musical career in 1985 as a sophomore at Lakewood High School, with the help of David Treaster, a classmate and a classically trained guitarist. The son of watercolor artist Richard Treaster, David Treaster exposed Dussault to B.B. King, Albert King, Freddie King, Johnny Winter, Stevie Ray Vaughan and the Allman Brothers. The two blues fans shortly teamed up with other classmates to form the short-lived Blues Junction, which performed at house parties, a battle of the bands and a high school talent show.

Dussault began to play professionally after graduating from Lakewood High in 1987. In the summer of, he sat in on harmonica with big band leader and CBS Records Recording Artist Al Serafini at a wedding reception the Dussault family was attending. Serafini, who over twenty years earlier had booked gigs for the Blackweles, a band that featured Colin's father, Artie Dussault, on bass, invited the younger Dussault onstage. The enthusiastic audience response prompted Dussault to find work with various local bands including the Delgado Brothers, Bill Dawg and the Extraordinaires, and Hitman. Eventually, Hitman evolved into Colin Dussault's Blues Project, which debuted at the Ultimate Sports Bar in Lakewood on Saturday, May 13, 1989.

The band was soon playing all over Greater Cleveland. It now performs more than 300 shows a year at venues such as blues clubs, biker bars, and upscale wineries, from the Lake Erie Islands to upstate New York, and often opens up for national touring blues and rock artists. Its membership has included alumni of such well-known Cleveland bands as Moonlight Drive, the Saxons, Gary Lewis and the Playboys, Calabash, Mr. Stress Blues Band, Anne E. DeChant, Jehovah's Waitresses, the Pony Express Band, and I-Tal. The current lineup, besides Dussault, is charter member Jimmy Feeney (guitar); John Atzberger (bass, vocals); Brent Lane (keyboards); Steve Savesky (drums) and roadie Robbie Green aka Robo, the Dali-Robbie, The Robbie Lama, ElToro-Roho and The Emporror Robo-Eeato.

In 2010, Dussault allied with Tie-Dye Harvest's Jim Tigue and Michael Stanley Band and Wish You were Here bassist/vocalist Eric "Eroc" Sosinski to form Colin Dussault's Acoustic Side Project.

In 2018 Dussault joined forces with Alex Bevan and Michael Stanley to write, record and release a CD single titled "A Song for our Children". The song was written in the aftermath of the Parkland, Florida school shootings. Proceeds from the sale of the CD single will be donated to Moms Demand Action For Gun Sense in America. momsdemandaction.org

Performances
Dussault and his band have opened for blues performers and rock groups including Johnny Winter, Glen Schwartz, Valerie Wellington, Big Jack Johnson and the Oilers, Joe Bonamassa, and Duke Robillard; Billy Branch, James Cotton, and Carey Bell; John Mayall and Chris Duarte, Johnny Lang, Buckwheat Zydeco, Robert Lockwood, Jr.; Bad Company and Eddie Money; Steppenwolf; Kim Wilson and the Fabulous Thunderbirds, Buddy Guy, Steve Miller and George Thorogood, Blue Oyster Cult, Ronnie Earle, Valerie Wellington, Robert Lockwood Jr., Chicago Legendary Blues Band, and Sugar Ray and the Broadcasters, Elvin Bishop Band with Little Smokey, Roomful of Blues, the Nighthawks, Anson Funderburgh and the Rockets, Bob Margolin's Rolling Fork Review, Hubert Sumlin and Levon Helm, and Michael Stanley.

Colin Dussault appeared with the band Nightbridge at a July 1998 political fundraiser for U.S. Senate Candidate Mary O. Boyle that featured an appearance by then first lady Hillary Clinton. Colin Dussault and his band also performed with the band Roosevelt and Bruce Springsteen at the 2004 Election Eve Rally for Presidential hopeful John Kerry held at Mall C in Downtown Cleveland on November 1, 2004. On November 26, 2004, Colin Dussault and his band appeared live on Cleveland's Fox 8 News Morning show performing "Sweet Home Chicago" with Dan Aykroyd in conjunction with the opening of the Cleveland House of Blues.

Colin Dussault has released 11 self-produced and self-marketed compact disc recordings to date on his Erica Records/Buddha Belly Productions label. Dussault has also appeared on copious other recordings by Cleveland artists as a session player. The band's music can be heard on Cleveland's WNCX 98.5 Classic Rock who continually include "Fire and Rain," "Good Booty and BBQ"," and "Little Chicken Wing Girl" in their playlists. "Good Booty and BBQ," written by Greg Bandy along with Colin Dussault, has been covered by several local and national acts including Chicago's Howard and the White Boys who included the song on their 2007 CD "Made in Chicago," released and distributed by Evidence Music.

Discography

Studio albums
 Colin Dussault, His Blues Project and Friends (1994)
 Colin Dussault's Blues Project Recorded Live at the Brother's Lounge (1995)
 Moving On (1998)
 Highlights (2001)
 Official Bootleg-Live at Tri-C (2003)
 The Best Of-Greatest Hits Collection (2004)
 Not Tonight Baby I've Got the Blues (2004)
 Watch This! (2005)
 Live at the Main Street Café (2006)
 Colinized! (2007)
 Colin Dussault's Acoustic Side Project (2010)
 Trailer Love (2012)
 Stress Relief (2014)
 Hoodoo Voodoo (2015)
 My Mother Front Window (2015)
 Swingos Film Soundtrack (2016)
 A Song For Our Children (CD single) with Alex Bevan, Michael Stanley & various other artists (2018)

Compilation/Session albums
 I've Got the Blues in Cleveland (1994)
 Northcoast Blend NORML (1996)
 Highlights (1999)
 The Best of Cleveland Blues (2003)
 Michael Stanley & Friends A Heartland Holiday Sampler (2009)
 By Your Side - Kristine Jackson
 Time is a Line, Crazy Carl - Sands and Hearn (2017)

Discography; session player information
The Skydogs "And Then" Lazy Eye Records Gut 001. Released 1994
Colin Dussault plays harmonica on track # 5 "Mississippi Jim Turn the Trick Blues"

"The House on Chestnut Ridge" children's musical. Released 1994 & 2001
(Finalist in the 2000 John Lennon Songwriting Contest in the Children's songwriting category)
Colin Dussault sings on track No. 1 "Chestnut Ridge,:
lead vocals and harmonica on track No. 5"Look At You."  Vocals on track # 10 "Chestnut Ridge Reprise"

Walkin' Cane & The Sky Dogs "Help Yourself" Lazy Eye Records FCD 4077. Released 1996.  Colin Dussault plays harmonica and sings back up on track No. 3 "Linin' Track (Tie Shuffling Chant)." Backup vocals on track No. 4 "Drinkin' Tanqueray" Harmonica & back up vocals on track No. 6 "Sweet Jelly Rollin". Harmonica on track No. 7 "Mississippi Jim, Turn the Trick Blues"

Kung Fu Grip "Original Motion Picture Soundtrack" Released 1998.
Colin Dussault plays harmonica on track No. 3"Vent"

Cletus Black "Back It Up" Night Wax Records NW 105. Released 1997.
Colin Dussault plays harmonica on track No. 4 "Baby Please Don't Leave". Harmonica on track No. 5 "Stage Left (Break a Leg)". Harmonica on track No. 7 "Depot Road". Harmonica on track # 13 "I'm Cryin'".

Calabash  "Flowerbed" Buckethead Productions. Released 1997
Colin Dussault plays harmonica on track No. 1 "She Never Talks That Way About You"

Anne DeChant "Effort of the Spin" Green Plastic Records AD91 102. Released 1997. Colin Dussault plays harmonica on track No. 9 "From The Fields"

Christopher "Undo Mentalis: The Mind of the Land" Shirtless Records TG6. Released 1999. Colin Dussault plays harmonica on track No. 2 "Ignatia's Angel"

Walkin' Cane "Murder of a Blues Singer". Released 2008
Colin Dussault plays harmonica and sings back up on track No. 4 "Step It Up & Go"
Harmonica on track No. 5 "Ramblin' On My Mind" Harmonica on track No. 6 "Georgia Moon". Harmonica on track No. 8 "Hold On The Night". Harmonica on track No. 9 "Late Great Singer".

Awards
 Best Regional Blues Band Cleveland Scene Reader's Poll (1998)
 Best Harmonica Player Cleveland Free Times Music Awards (2000)
 Best Blues Band Cleveland Free Times Music Awards (2004, 2005, 2006, 2008)

Television and radio appearances
 WMJI 105.7 FM Radio Cleveland, Lanigan & Malone Morning Show (December 5, 2003; August 25, 2004; June 7, 2006; May 15, 2009)
 WVIZ Cleveland Public Television, Applause Show (November 3, 2004; December 17, 2007; November 2, 2010/Acoustic Side Project; September 29, 2011)
 WKYC Television Cleveland NBC Channel 3 (March 9, 2007; December 18, 2007 taping to promote First Night Akron appearance that aired December 24, 2007; May 30, 2008/Acoustic Side Project)
 WJW Fox 8 News Morning Show Cleveland (June 22, 1999; May 9, 2004; February 11 and August 2, 2005; January 20, 2006/Live with Mr. Stress, Pete Cavanaugh, and Dave Morrison of Aces and Eights; June 15, 2007/live performances in front of Rock and Roll Hall of Fame and Museum; May 11, 2009; November 22, 2010/Acoustic Side Project; May 2 and July 7, 2011)
 WEWS Cleveland News Channel 5 (October 17, 2005 afternoon news segment)
 WCSB 89.3 FM Cleveland State University Radio (May 10 and November 22, 1995; August 11, 2004)
 The Summit Radio 91.3 FM Akron (Jim Chenot Radio Sandbox Program December 6, 2002; May 30, 2003; Aug. 13, 2004 with Greg Hurd; December 30, 2005 with Walkin' Cane; June 13, 2006).
 WKNR ESPN AM 850, (July 15, 2011/Tony Rizzo Big Show with Al Bubba Baker to promote Grapes n Ale event)
 K96 WKFM 96.1 Radio Sandusky Morning Show (October 21, 2005)
 WCPN 90.3 FM Cleveland Public Radio (Around Noon program December 31, 1997; November 25, 1998; May 30, 2003; May 13, 2009; November 23, 2010; Open Air performance of Acoustic Side Project July 28, 2011; appearance on Sound of Ideas with Mike McIntyre October 25, 2011)
 Mix 106.5 FM Cleveland (interview on Brian & Joe Morning Show February 2, 2005)
 WONE-FM 97.5 FM Akron (Jim Chenot Show December 23, 1997)

Footnotes

References
 Benson, John. "You Should Hear, Cleveland Plain Dealer, December 16, 2005.
 Benson, John. "Bud Man," Cleveland Scene,  November 19–25, 1998, page 42.
 Bruening, John C. Cleveland Scene, Regional Recordings review, September 8–14, 1995.
 Cassady, Charles. "Bluesman bounces back after ailment to keep playing." [West Life], July 23, 2008.
 Cielec, Greg. "Cool Cleveland Sounds" CD review Cool Cleveland, December 14, 2005.
 Ferris, D. X. "Makin' The Scene: A Very Bluesy Birthday" Cleveland Scene, May 13, 2009.
 Feur, Alan. "Luring a Star: Big City Beckons; Cleveland Begs." The New York Times, Saturday, June 5, 2010.
 Garrigue, Andy. "Old Style Fits Newcomer," Hohner Harmonica Easy Reeding, Fall 1996, page 14.
 Holan, Mark. "An On-The-Job Training Course in the Blues," Cleveland Scene Local Spotlight, date unknown.
 Johnson, Kevin C. "Off the Record." Akron Beacon Journal, "Enjoy!" August 15, 1996.
 Lloyd, Phil. "Colin Dussault's Blues Project: Cool In Cleveland," American Harmonica Newsletter, August 1998, Volume 9, Number 8.
 Pantsios, Anastasia. "Almost Famous" Local Only article Cleveland Scene, Thursday December 22, 1998.
 
 Rawls, Alex. "New Orleans Still Struggles-In Song-With Katrina," The Village Voice, Aug. 27, 2008.
 
 Vickers, Jim. "Local Sounds CD review" Cleveland Magazine, November 2004.
 Vozar, Roger. "Future Looking Rosy For Blues Band," Lakewood Sun Post, May 18, 1995.
 Vozar, Roger. "The Lure of Music Keeps this Mover Singing the Blues." Sun Herald, June 9, 1994, Section C.
 Cleveland Scene, "Callin' Dussault," November 14–20, 2007, Page 17.
 
 
 Hohner Harmonica Easy Reading Newsletter, Spring 2000, page 2.
 Living Blues Magazine, March/April 2006, Short Takes, CD review
 
 The Intelligencer & Wheeling News Register Supplement, August 10, 11, 12, 2006, page 3.

American blues rock musical groups
Musical groups from Cleveland